South Korea competed at the 2003 World Championships in Athletics from August 23 to 31. A team of 7 athletes was announced in preparation for the competition.

Results

Men

Women

References
Result by Events. 

World Championships in Athletics
2003
Nations at the 2003 World Championships in Athletics